The women's 400 metres event at the 1986 European Athletics Championships was held in Stuttgart, then West Germany, at Neckarstadion on 26, 27, and 28 August 1986.

Medalists

Results

Final
28 August

Semi-finals
27 August

Semi-final 1

Semi-final 2

Heats
26 August

Heat 1

Heat 2

Heat 3

Participation
According to an unofficial count, 18 athletes from 11 countries participated in the event.

 (1)
 (3)
 (1)
 (1)
 (2)
 (1)
 (1)
 (3)
 (1)
 (1)
 (3)

References

400 metres
400 metres at the European Athletics Championships
1986 in women's athletics